Desagati is a type of minor principality in India. It was controlled by a leader called a Desai.

Desagati families
Desagati families (also known as Nadagouda, Desai family) are mentioned in 9th century inscriptions.

Desagatis in Karnataka

Ingalagi Desagati
Annarao Deshpande (who was a Desai of Ingalagi in present day Bagalkot taluk) had Ingalagi, Kesanur, Bhagavati, Mudapuji and Aanadinni under his Desagati.

Nipani Desagati
The origin of Nipani Desagati dates back to 1685 when a Mughal governor granted 14 villages as Inam from Hukeri province that belonged to Parganas of Kab bur, Sollapur, Lat (Khadaklat), Soundalaga etc

Recognition
 Indian Council of Historical Research sponsored one-day national seminar, conducted on 4 October 2019 on the topic Desagati Principalities of Bombay Karnataka (1565-1947 A.D.) at K.L.E Society’s Arts and Commerce College, Hatalageri Naka, Gadag district, Karnataka (India).
 University Grants Commission (India) sponsored national seminar was held at V.M.S.R Vastrad Arts, Science and Commerce college at Hunagunda on the topic Contributions of Desagati Families of our state

References

History of Karnataka